37 Seconds is a 2019 Japanese drama film written and directed by . The film features amateur actress Mei Kayama, who has cerebral palsy, as 23-year-old Yuma Takada, a talented artist who wants to make her name in manga. A sympathetic magazine editor (Yuka Itaya) tells Takada her art is technically proficient but betrays her lack of worldly experience. Criticizing her depictions of sex as unconvincing, the editor tells the young woman, who uses a wheelchair to get around, to lose her virginity and then return.

The film was screened at the 69th Berlin International Film Festival and won the Audience Award and the International Confederation of Art Cinemas’ Art Cinema Award in the festival's Panorama section.

Cast
 Mei Kayama as Yuma Takada
 Misuzu Kanno as Kyoko Takada
 Shunsuke Daitō as Toshiya
 Makiko Watanabe as Mai
 Minori Hagiwara as Sayaka
 Yuka Itaya as Fujimoto
 Shizuka Ishibashi as Physical Therapist
 Kiyohiko Shibukawa as Pimp
 Shôhei Uno as Iketani

Release
The film had its world premiere at the Berlin International Film Festival, and also played at the 2019 Tribeca Film Festival and was also screened at the 2019 Toronto International Film Festival in the Contemporary World Cinema section. The international sales company Films Boutique holds the rights, while Netflix holds distribution rights for the United States and Canada.

References

External links
 Official website
 
 

2019 films
2019 drama films
2019 independent films
2010s Japanese-language films
Japanese drama films
Japanese independent films
Films about people with cerebral palsy
2010s Japanese films